Timur Tekkal (born 3 June 1981) is a German international rugby union player. He was born in Hannover, and for the DSV 78 Hannover in the Rugby-Bundesliga.

He made his international debut for Germany in 2004 against the Netherlands and his last game on 2 May 2009 against Russia.

He plays rugby since 1988.

Tekkal has also played for the Germany's 7's side in the past, like at the 2009 Hannover Sevens and the 2009 London Sevens. He was also part of the German Sevens side at the World Games 2005 in Duisburg, where Germany finished 8th.

At the end of the 2010-11 season, Tekkal left Victoria Linden to join DSV 78 Hannover for the following season.

Honours

National team
 European Nations Cup - Division 2
 Champions: 2008

Club
 German rugby union championship
 Champions: 2000
 German rugby union cup
 Champions: 2000

Stats
Timur Tekkal's personal statistics in club and international rugby:

Club

 As of 30 April 2012

National team

European Nations Cup

Friendlies & other competitions

 As of 7 March 2010

References

External links
 Timur Tekkal at scrum.com
   Timur Tekkal at totalrugby.de
  Timur Tekkal at the DRV website

1981 births
Living people
German rugby union players
Germany international rugby union players
TSV Victoria Linden players
DRC Hannover players
DSV 78 Hannover players
Rugby union number eights
Sportspeople from Hanover